The Firelands Conference is an Ohio High School Athletic Association (OHSAA) athletic league located in north-central Ohio. The league was formed in the 1960–61 school year and is named for the Firelands area of the old Western Reserve, where most of the member schools reside.  High schools in this conference are located in Ashland, Huron, and Richland counties.  Some of the schools' district boundaries extend into the neighboring counties of Crawford, Erie, and Lorain.  Most of the founding schools came from the defunct Huron-Erie League.

Conference membership

Current members

Former members

Berlin Heights and Milan competed separately until consolidating into Edison High School in 1968.
Hayesville and Jeromesville competed separately in the FC only for the spring of 1963 before consolidating into Hillsdale for 1963-64.

League history

1960s
1960: The Firelands Conference was formed with the inaugural members of Berlin Heights, Milan, Monroeville, South Central, Perkins, and Western Reserve.
1963: Perkins withdrew after the 1962-63 winter sports season.  Hayesville, Jeromesville, and Mapleton join the league in the spring of 1963.  Hillsdale becomes a member for the 1963-64 school year when Hayesville and Jeromesville consolidate.
1964: Black River joins.
1965: Berlin Heights and Milan join their districts into the Berlin-Milan School District, but continue to compete separately.
1968: Berlin Heights and Milan consolidate to form Edison, which remains in the conference.
1968: St. Paul joins the conference.

1970s
1970: Hillsdale leaves to join the Wayne County Athletic League after the 1969-70 school year.  New London takes their place for the 1970-71 school year after leaving the Lakeland Conference.

1980s
1982: Crestview and Plymouth both join after leaving the Black Fork Valley Conference.  Both had also previously been in the Johnny Appleseed Conference until 1978.  The league would split into two divisions: North (Edison, Monroeville, New London, St. Paul, Western Reserve) and South (Black River, Crestview, Mapleton, Plymouth, South Central).
1986: Edison leaves to join the Sandusky Bay Conference.  The divisions dissolve.

1990s
1993: Black River leaves to eventually join the Mohican Area Conference.

Divisional Setup 1982-1986

Conference Football Championship Game

Conference Champions

Boys Champions

Girls Champions

Note: Track & Field champions provided by the 2012 Firelands Conference Track & Field Championships program.

State Champions

Current Firelands Conference member schools have won a total of 11 team state championships, dating back to the beginning of Ohio High School Athletic Association sponsored tournaments.

Crestivew
Boys Golf - 2012
 Monroeville
 Boys Basketball - 1984
 Boys Wrestling - 2010
 New London
 Boys Track and Field – 1946 *
Boys (Football) 1951  Class "B" State Champs as voted on by First and Ten magazine.
 Boys Cross Country – 1993
 Plymouth
 Boys Cross Country – 1971 *
 Boys Cross Country – 1974 *
 St. Paul
 Girls Volleyball - 2002
 Girls Volleyball - 2006
 Boys Football - 1969
 Boys Football - 2009

* State championship won before the school was affiliated with the Firelands Conference.

See also
Ohio High School Athletic Association
Ohio High School Athletic Conferences

References

External links
Firelands Conference History
Fit for a Pirate? Ashland Times-Gazette, Dec 26, 2009
Monroeville Athletics (provided MHS FC league titles)
FlyerFootball.com
High School Wrestling Firelands Conference Championships Endicott, Oney get big win, Feb 15, 2010

Ohio high school sports conferences